Horne railway station is a railway station located about  west of the village of Horne between Hirtshals and Hjørring in Vendsyssel, Denmark.

The station is located on the Hirtshals Line from Hirtshals to Hjørring. It opened in 1925. The train services are currently operated by Nordjyske Jernbaner which run frequent local train services between Hirtshals and Hjørring with onward connections from Hjørring to the rest of Denmark.

History 

The station opened in 1925. The station was closed in 1970 but continued as a halt.

Architecture 
The station building from 1925 was designed by the Danish architect Sylvius Knutzen.

Operations 
The train services are currently operated by Nordjyske Jernbaner which run frequent local train services between Hirtshals and Hjørring with onward connections from Hjørring to the rest of Denmark.

See also
 List of railway stations in Denmark

References

Notes

Bibliography

External links

 Nordjyske Jernbaner – Danish railway company operating in North Jutland Region
 Danske Jernbaner – website with information on railway history in Denmark
 Nordjyllands Jernbaner – website with information on railway history in North Jutland

Railway stations in the North Jutland Region
Sylvius Knutzen railway stations